Richard Parsons (born 1966) of Broughton-in-Furness, Cumbria, England is a former teacher and the author of a series of best-selling GCSE study guides. In a league table of the top UK authors, by number of books sold, compiled by The Bookseller magazine, for the period 2000-2009, he ranked fifth.

Dissatisfied with the quality of study guides during his teaching career at Furness College, Parsons quit in 1995 and began writing his first manuscript, which was later published through his own company, Coordination Group Publications. By the end of 2009, his 600 titles had sold over nine million books grossing over £48 million. Though he wrote the original books himself and they all bear his name, later books were written by other teachers. Parsons wrote the motivational book, How to fulfill your wildest dreams!, that was published in 1990, by Mega-Books (Broughton-in-Furness). He also owns a petrol station and leisure centre in Broughton.

Parsons, a keen cyclist, lives in an apartment in Broughton with his wife Kyra and two children. His mother, Heather Parsons, is also a former teacher, and his father is a dentist. Parsons went to Ulverston Victoria High School before gaining a First in Physics at Oxford University. On graduating, he taught mathematics at Furness College, Barrow-in-Furness.

Parsons donated £100,000, in January 2008, to the parish of Broughton and Duddon to pay for essential repairs to St Mary Magdalene and the Holy Innocents Church.

His company, Coordination Group Publications, is valued at £120 million, giving Parsons, who owns 95%, a net worth of £114 million.

References

External links

English writers
British textbook writers
People from Broughton-in-Furness
Alumni of the University of Oxford
1966 births
Living people
People educated at Ulverston Grammar School